The Downer family has played a significant role in the South Australian and Australian political and social sphere since the early days of European settlement. Their earliest ancestors were Mary Ann Downer (1792–1868) and her son Henry Downer, a tailor (1811–1870), who travelled from England to Australia in 1862, settling in Adelaide.

References

External links
The Alexander Downer Archival Collection at the University of South Australia Library

 
Australian people of English descent
Political families of Australia